Brunaille is a painting executed entirely or primarily in shades of brown.  Such a painting is described as having been painted "en brunaille".  

Brunaille has its roots in 12th century stained glass made for Cistercian monasteries,  which prohibited the use of colored art in 1134. However, it was only in the early 17th century that the French term “brunaille” was coined to describe pictures painted in shades of brown. Brunaille are less common than paintings executed in grey (grisaille), though more common than those in green (verdaille).

References

External links 

Artistic techniques
Painting techniques
Decorative arts